Declan O'Brien (December 21, 1965 – February 16, 2022) was an American film and television writer and director. He was known as the director of three films in the Wrong Turn series (2009–2012) and he was the president of Fairport Filmworks.

Biography 
His work with Syfy has also included writing for the film The Snake King, and he wrote the screenplay for The Harpy, which began pre-production on June 26, 2006. O'Brien directed the third, the fourth, and the fifth films of the Wrong Turn series, and wrote the latter two films. He directed Roger Corman's 2010 horror film Sharktopus.

He died on February 16, 2022.

Selected credits 
The Marine 4: Moving Target (2015) (characters)
Joy Ride 3: Roadkill (2014) (director / writer)
The Marine 3: Homefront (2013) (writer)
Wrong Turn 5: Bloodlines (2012) (director / writer)
Wrong Turn 4: Bloody Beginnings (2011) (director / writer)
Sharktopus (2010) (director)
Wrong Turn 3: Left for Dead (2009) (director)
Rock Monster (2008) (director / writer)
Genesis Code (2008) (director / writer)
Cyclops (2008) (director)
Alice Upside Down (2007) (producer / story)
Creature Unknown (2004) (executive producer)
On the 2nd Day of Christmas (1997) (co-producer)

References

External links

Obituary

1965 births
2022 deaths
American film producers
Horror film directors
People from Rochester, New York